Tariq ul Hakim is a justice of the Supreme Court of Bangladesh.

Early life and education 

Justice Tariqul Ul Hakim son of a diplomat and third generation High Court Justice in Bangladesh, after his father Justice Maksum-ul-Hakim former ambassador and justice of the Bangladesh High Court and his maternal grandfather Justice Amin Ahmed former Chief Justice of East Pakistan.

Hakim completed his legal education, postgraduate law degree from the UK and was called to Bar of England and Wales from Grays Inn.

References 

1953 births
Living people
Bangladeshi judges
20th-century Bangladeshi lawyers
21st-century Bangladeshi lawyers